Statistics of the 1962 Cameroonian Premier League season.

Overview
Caïman Douala won the championship.

References
Cameroon - List of final tables (RSSSF)

1962 in Cameroonian football
Cam
Cam
Elite One seasons